Simón Bolívar District is one of the districts of Caaguazú Department, Paraguay.